Leslie Shows (born 1977) is an American artist, who is recognized for expanding the boundaries of landscape painting.

Early life and education 
Leslie Shows was born in 1977 in Manteca, California. Her childhood in Juneau, Alaska had an intense impact on the work she would create as an adult. She received her B.F.A. degree in 1999 from the San Francisco Art Institute (SFAI), and earned her M.F.A. degree from the California College of the Arts (CCA) in 2006.

Work 
Shows' earlier works were mixed-media collages depicting abstracted landscapes.  Her more recent paintings, while retaining the use of mixed media, have become more abstracted and focus on mineral textures and geologic features. Her work is included in the collection at San Francisco Museum of Modern Art.

Awards and residencies
2012 International Studio and Curatorial Program, Artadia New York Residency
2011 Bemis Center for the Arts
2010 Millay Colony for the Arts
2009 Artadia Award
2008 Eureka Fellowship, Fleishhacker Foundation
2007 Printmaking Fellowship, Kala Art Institute
2006 SECA Art Award, San Francisco Museum of Modern Art
2006 Tournesol Award, Headlands Center for the Arts

Solo exhibitions 
 Surfacing, Scottsdale Museum of Contemporary Art, Scottsdale, Arizona (2014)
 Leslie Shows, Bemis Center for Contemporary Arts, Omaha, Nebraska (2012)
 Split Array, Haines Gallery, San Francisco, California (2011)
 Five Grounds, Jack Hanley Gallery, New York, New York (2010) 
 The New Dust, Jack Hanley Gallery, New York, New York (2008)
 Carbon Freeze, Jack Hanley Gallery, Los Angeles, California (2006)
 International Parks, Jack Hanley Gallery, San Francisco, California (2005)

References

External links

 

YBCA / Wallworks Artist Interview with Leslie Shows
75 Reasons to live: Jennifer Sonderby on Leslie Shows's Two Ways to Organize
Leslie Shows surfacing at the Scottsdale Museum of Contemporary Art

1977 births
Living people
21st-century American painters
21st-century American women artists
American women painters
Artists from the San Francisco Bay Area
California College of the Arts alumni
Painters from California
San Francisco Art Institute alumni